Sadınlar (also, Sadynlar) is a village in the Lachin Rayon of Azerbaijan.

References 

Populated places in Lachin District